Kimaru Songok (born 1936 in Nandi District) is a former Kenyan runner who specialised in 400 metres hurdles.

He was among the first Kenyan medalists internationally, when he won silver in 440 yards hurdles at the 1962 Commonwealth Games. Songok was also part of the Kenyan 4 x 440 yards relay team which finished fifth. Other members of the relay team were Wilson Kiprugut, Peter Francis and Seraphino Antao. At the same games, Antao became the first Kenyan international champion.

He won 400 metres hurdles gold medal at the inaugural All-Africa Games in 1965. He also won multiple gold medals at the East and Central African Championships.

He competed at the 1964 and 1968 Olympics, but failed to advance beyond heats both times.

References 

Living people
1936 births
People from Nandi County
Kenyan male hurdlers
Commonwealth Games silver medallists for Kenya
Commonwealth Games medallists in athletics
Athletes (track and field) at the 1962 British Empire and Commonwealth Games
Athletes (track and field) at the 1966 British Empire and Commonwealth Games
Athletes (track and field) at the 1964 Summer Olympics
Athletes (track and field) at the 1968 Summer Olympics
Olympic athletes of Kenya
African Games gold medalists for Kenya
African Games medalists in athletics (track and field)
Athletes (track and field) at the 1965 All-Africa Games
Medallists at the 1962 British Empire and Commonwealth Games